Torda (or ) is a village in Serbia. It is situated in the Žitište municipality, in the Central Banat District, Vojvodina province. The village has a Hungarian ethnic majority (86.56%) and its population numbering 1,771 people (2002 census). The village was settled in 1789 by the Pejačević family.

Geography

The surrounding villages include: Banatsko Karađorđevo, Čestereg, Banatski Dvor, Melenci, Bašaid, etc.

Historical population

1961: 3,803
1971: 3,345
1981: 2,697
1991: 2,183

See also
List of places in Serbia
List of cities, towns and villages in Vojvodina

References
Slobodan Ćurčić, Broj stanovnika Vojvodine, Novi Sad, 1996.
József Dobai, Torda Krónikája, Novi Sad, 2012

External links
 History of Torda 

Populated places in Serbian Banat